Adrian Schlagbauer (born 9 July 2002) is a German footballer who plays as a midfielder for Würzburger Kickers.

Career
Schlagbauer made his professional debut for Würzburger Kickers in the 2. Bundesliga on 23 May 2021, coming on as a substitute in the 89th minute for Marvin Pieringer. The home match finished as a 1–1 draw.

Personal life
Schlagbauer is the son of Dr. Michael Schlagbauer, an honorary president of Würzburger Kickers who served as the club's president and executive board chairman for 16 years.

References

External links
 
 
 

2002 births
Living people
German footballers
Association football midfielders
Würzburger Kickers players
2. Bundesliga players